Limnesia is a genus of mites belonging to the family Limnesiidae.

The genus has cosmopolitan distribution.

Species:
 Limnesia acuminata Walter, 1925 
 Limnesia alzatei (Duges, 1884)
 Limnesia fulgida (Koch 1836)

References
https://www.gbif.org/species/2180711

Trombidiformes
Trombidiformes genera